Miguel Ángel Terceros Acuña (born 25 April 2004), sometimes known as Miguelito, is a Bolivian football player who plays as either an attacking midfielder or a forward for Brazilian club Santos, and the Bolivia national team.

Club career

Early career
In 2015, aged 11, he joined Proyecto Bolivia 2022, a social project which had partnerships with several clubs in South America.

Santos
Terceros joined Santos in 2018, aged 14, after being approved on a trial. However, as FIFA does not allow transfers of under-18 foreign players, he did not sign a contract with the club, only having an exchange program arrangement.

In March 2021, Terceros impressed during trainings and started to feature with Santos' under-23 squad. On 26 April 2022, one day after his 18th birthday, he signed a contract with the club until April 2027.

Terceros was officially able to play for Santos in July 2022, after being registered once the transfer window opened; he started to feature in the under-20 squad. He made his first team – and Série A – debut on 10 October, coming on as a late substitute for goalscorer Lucas Braga in a 4–1 home success over Juventude; he also became the first Bolivian to play for the club.

International career
Terceros featured for the Bolivia under-15 national team in the 2019 South American U-15 Championship, playing in all five matches during the competition. In December 2020, aged just 16, he was called up by manager César Farías with the under-20s for an international friendly tournament in Rio de Janeiro.

On 30 October 2021, Terceros was called up by Farías, but now to the full side for one friendly against El Salvador and two 2022 FIFA World Cup qualifying matches against Peru and Peru. He made his full international debut on 24 September 2022, replacing Ramiro Vaca in a 2–0 friendly loss against Senegal in Orléans, France.

Career statistics

Club

International

Honours
Santos
: 2022

References

External links
 
 

2004 births
Living people
Sportspeople from Santa Cruz de la Sierra
Bolivian footballers
Association football midfielders
Campeonato Brasileiro Série A players
Santos FC players
Bolivia youth international footballers
Bolivia under-20 international footballers
Bolivia international footballers
Bolivian expatriate footballers
Bolivian expatriate sportspeople in Brazil
Expatriate footballers in Brazil